Windsor Gardens may refer to:

 32 Windsor Gardens, the home of Paddington Bear
 Windsor Gardens (Chatswood), a heritage-listed property in the Sydney suburb of Chatswood, in Australia
 Windsor Gardens, South Australia
 Windsor Gardens (MBTA station) in Norwood, Massachusetts